Minervarya sahyadris, also known as the small cricket frog,  is a species of frog in the family Dicroglossidae. It is endemic to central Western Ghats of kerala& Karnataka in India.

Distribution

Habitat

It is a semi-aquatic, terrestrial species. It has been found from grassy areas adjacent to paddy fields, disturbed (open) moist tropical forest, stream banks and abandoned quarries. It is threatened by habitat loss.

Description
This species is about 22 mm in length and is nocturnal. It is seen in loose groups; key identifying features include pointed snout, presence of rictal gland, supratympanic fold from back of eye to shoulder, mid dorsum reddish to reddish brown in colour and minimal webbing in feet.

References

sahyadris
Frogs of India
Endemic fauna of the Western Ghats
Amphibians described in 2001
Taxa named by Sathyabhama Das Biju
Taxonomy articles created by Polbot